Aleksei Aleksandrovich Gritsayenko (born 25 May 1995) is a Russian football player who plays as a centre-back for FC Rubin Kazan.

Club career
He made his debut in the Russian Football National League for FC Luch-Energiya Vladivostok on 11 March 2016 in a game against FC Spartak-2 Moscow.

On 13 June 2017, he signed a 4-year contract with FC Krasnodar.

On 14 June 2018, he joined FC Yenisey Krasnoyarsk on loan for the 2018–19 season.

On 2 September 2019, he joined FC Tambov on loan for the 2019–20 season.

On 10 August 2020, he reached agreement with Krasnodar to terminate their contract and signed a two-year contract with Tambov.

On 1 February 2021, he signed a 4-year contract with FC Rubin Kazan. On 2 September 2021, he joined FC Kuban Krasnodar on loan for the 2021–22 season.

Career statistics

References

External links
 Profile by Russian Football National League

1995 births
Sportspeople from Vladivostok
Living people
Russian footballers
Association football defenders
FC Luch Vladivostok players
FC Krasnodar players
FC Krasnodar-2 players
FC Yenisey Krasnoyarsk players
FC Tambov players
FC Rubin Kazan players
FC Urozhay Krasnodar players
Russian Premier League players
Russian First League players
Russian Second League players